Reborn is an album by Eric Lévi's new-age project Era, released in 2008 (see 2008 in music).

Videos were shot for "Reborn" and "Prayers".

Track listing
 "Reborn" – 5:32
 "Prayers" – 4:20
 "Dark Voices" – 5:01
 "Sinfoni Deo"  – 4:41
 "Come into My World" – 5:19
 "Kilimandjaro" – 4:35
 "Thousand Words" – 5:21
 "After Thousand words" – 4:59
 "Last Song" – 4:50
 "Come into My world" (Remix) – 9:15

Chart positions

Weekly

Year-end

Certifications

References

Era (musical project) albums
2008 albums